Gold Diggers, also released as Russian Affairs, is a Russian drama series produced by Yellow, Black and White for START. The series is about kept-women and the rich men they have relations with.  For theater director Konstantin Bogomolov, the first season of the project was his debut in the genre of episodic series.  The streaming series was among the first of its kind in Russia to achieve high ratings. It was sold to Amazon Prime to be distributed under its Originals label in 2019.

It has been compared to Dynasty in the English-speaking press.

Synopsis
Young artist Dasha Smirnova comes from Saratov to Moscow to change her life.  She is immersed in the world of glamor and easy money by her school friend Marina Levkoeva, whose only source of income is a relationship with a married official Igor Dolgachev, with whom she met thanks to a matchmaker to the elite in Moscow.

Alisa Olkhovska put more than one beautiful girl in safe hands, and she was able to go from gold digging to being the wife of a prosperous developer.  And now she shares with Marina not only social gatherings, but also a young lover, Kir.

Meanwhile, other women have other worries.  And while some spend money on another diamond necklace, others are thinking about how to reach a higher salary.  This is the reality for investigator Alyona Shirokova, who finds solutions to pressing problems in sex with her lover-colleague Maxim.  However, Alyona will soon get acquainted with the beautiful life closer: when the body of one of the girls is found in the toilet of an elite restaurant, and the investigation of this confusing case will reveal to Alyona unattractive secrets of many residents of Moscow.

Cast

Main roles

External links
 
 Gold Diggers on Start

References

Russian drama television series
Works set in Moscow
2019 web series debuts
2019 Russian television series debuts
2021 Russian television series endings
2010s Russian television series
2020s Russian television series